Donald Dean (born June 21, 1937) is a jazz drummer who has worked with Kenny Dorham, Les McCann and others. A collection related to him is led by the Los Angeles Jazz Institute.

He appears, alongside Les McCann and Eddie Harris, on the soul jazz album Swiss Movement, recorded live on June 21, 1969 at The Montreux Jazz Festival.

His grandson Jamael Dean is a musician who has worked, and performed, with Kamasi Washington, Thundercat, Miguel Atwood-Ferguson and Carlos Niño. Jamael is signed to Stones Throw Records on which he released his debut record, Black Space Tapes, in November 2019.

Discography

As sideman
With Les McCann
 Swiss Movement (Atlantic, 1969)
 Much Les (Atlantic, 1969)
 Comment (Atlantic, 1970)
 Second Movement (Atlantic, 1971)
 Invitation to Openness (Atlantic, 1972)
 Talk to the People (Atlantic, 1972)
 Live at Montreux (Atlantic, 1973)
 Layers (Atlantic, 1973)
 Les Is More (Night, 1991)

With Jimmy Smith
 Bluesmith (Verve, 1972)
 Paid in Full (Mojo, 1974)
 75 (Mojo, 1975)

With others
 Earl Anderza, Outa Sight (Pacific Jazz, 1998)
 Carmell Jones, Business Meeting (Pacific Jazz, 1962)
 Horace Tapscott, Live (Americana, 1988)
 Horace Tapscott, Why Don't You Listen? (Dark Tree, 2019)

References

Sources 
 Richard Cook & Brian Morton: The Penguin Guide to Jazz Recordings, 8th Edition, London, Penguin, 2006 
 Leonard Feather & Ira Gitler, The Biographical Encyclopedia of Jazz. Oxford/New York, 1999, 

American jazz drummers
1937 births
Living people
Place of birth missing (living people)
20th-century American drummers
American male drummers
20th-century American male musicians
American male jazz musicians